The Chinese Athletics Championships is an annual track and field competition which serves as the national championship for the People's Republic of China. It is organised by Chinese Athletic Association, China's national governing body for the sport of athletics. The event was first organised in 1910 as a men's only championship and women's championship events were introduced in 1959 – much later than at the Chinese National Games, which had featured women nearly thirty years earlier.

Men

100 metres
1988: Li Tao
1989: Yu Gang
1990: Li Tao
1991: Li Tao
1992: Li Tao
1993: Chen Wenzhong
1994: Chen Wenzhong
1995: Chen Wenzhong
1996: Chen Wenzhong
1997: Zhou Wei
1998: Zhou Wei
1999: Zhou Wei
2000: Chen Haijian
2001: Chen Haijian
2002: Wang Peng
2003: Chen Haijian
2004: Shen Yunbao
2005: Hu Kai

200 metres
1988: Cai Jianming
1989: Zhao Cunlin
1990: Cai Jianming
1991: Zhao Cunlin
1992: Zhao Cunlin
1993: Huang Danwei
1994: Chen Wenzhong
1995: Li Xiaoping
1996: Han Chaoming
1997: Yin Hanzhao
1998: Han Chaoming
1999: Yang Yaozu
2000: Xu Zizhou
2001: Han Chaoming
2002: Yang Yaozu
2003: Yang Yaozu
2004: Yang Yaozu
2005: Liu Haitao

400 metres
1988: Wang Jianming
1989: Zhao Cunlin
1990: Tan Guoheng
1991: Yu Jun
1992: Xie Hong
1993: Zhao Cunlin
1994: Lei Quan
1995: Si Yandong
1996: Han Chaoming
1997: Tang Weiming
1998: Xu Zizhou
1999: Xu Zizhou
2000: Xu Zizhou
2001: Jiang Bo
2002: Ni Zhenjie
2003: Xu Zizhou
2004: Wang Liangyu
2005: Wang Liangyu

800 metres
1988: Lou Shaolong
1989: Liang Siguang
1990: Lou Shaolong
1991: Han Bo
1992: Han Bo
1993: Lin Jun
1994: Min Weiguo
1995: Liu Gengqiang
1996: Song Mingyou
1997: Jiang Zhidong
1998: Cheng Bing
1999: Liu Gengqiang
2000: Li Guangming
2001: Li Huiquan
2002: Li Huiquan
2003: Li Huiquan
2004: Chi Yinan
2005: Li Guangming

1500 metres
1988: Zhang Yuejin
1989: Duan Xiuquan
1990: Chen Hongen
1991: Ji Longhui
1992: Wang Da
1993: Lin Jun
1994: Song Pengyou
1995: Song Pengyou
1996: Song Mingyou
1997: Song Mingyou
1998: Song Mingyou
1999: Gao Shuai
2000: Dou Zhaobo
2001: Dou Zhaobo
2002: Dou Zhaobo
2003: Dou Zhaobo
2004: Li Yan
2005: Gu Ming

5000 metres
1988: Wang Helin
1989: Zhang Guowei
1990: Zhang Guowei
1991: Wang Helin
1992: Jiu Shangxuan
1993: Ning Limin
1994: Sun Ripeng
1995: Xia Fengyuan
1996: Sun Ripeng
1997: Cao Changhai
1998: Xia Fengyuan
1999: Chen Fuchun
2000: Xia Fengyuan
2001: Zhang Yunshan
2002: Liu Huyuan
2003: Han Gang
2004: Chen Mingfu
2005: Zhang Yunshan

10,000 metres
1988: Zhang Guowei
1989: Zhang Guowei
1990: Jiu Shangxuan
1991: Han Zongmin
1992: Wang Helin
1993: Han Zongmin
1994: Zhang Fukui
1995: Xia Fengyuan
1996: Xia Fengyuan
1997: Xia Fengyuan
1998: Xia Fengyuan
1999: Yang Guocai
2000: Xia Fengyuan
2001: Zhang Yunshan
2002: Zhang Yunshan
2003: Gong Ke
2004: Zheng Kai
2005: Zhang Yunshan

Marathon
1988: Zhu Shuchun
1989: Zhang Guowei
1990: ?
1991: Liu Min
1992: Hu Gangjun
1993: Zhang Fukui
1994: Han Zongmin
1995: Dong Jianmin
1996: Meng Xianhui
1997: Hao Lijun
1998: Zhan Donglin
1999: ?
2000: Zhu Ronghua
2001: Chai Jiahua
2002: Gong Ke
2003: Li Zhuhong
2004: Li Zhuhong
2005: Li Jianfei
2006: Deng Haiyang

3000 metres steeplechase
1988: Gao Shuhai
1989: Wang Shubo
1990: Niu Xinhui
1991: Gao Shuhai
1992: Gao Shuhai
1993: Gao Shuhai
1994: Gao Shuhai
1995: Liu Lijun
1996: Qin Gang
1997: Li Changzhong
1998: Li Changzhong
1999: Sun Wenli
2000: Sun Wenli
2001: Sun Jiawei
2002: Sun Wenli
2003: Sun Wenli
2004: Sun Wenyong
2005: Sun Wenyong

110 metres hurdles
1988: Yu Zhicheng
1989: Yang Guang
1990: Yu Zhicheng
1991: Zheng Jinsuo
1992: Liu Tao
1993: Zheng Jinsuo
1994: Chen Yanjie
1995: Chen Yanhao
1996: Chen Yanhao
1997: Chen Yanhao
1998: Chen Yanhao
1999: Chen Yanhao
2000: Zhang Feng
2001: Chen Yanhao
2002: Liu Xiang
2003: Shi Dongpeng
2004: Liu Xiang
2005: Liu Xiang

400 metres hurdles
1988: Song Xinliang
1989: Wu Hongyu
1990: Shen Yi
1991: Shen Yi
1992: Gao Yonghong
1993: Du Yuechun
1994: Yang Xianjun
1995: Du Yuechun
1996: Tan Chunhua
1997: Tan Chunhua
1998: Tan Chunhua
1999: Lao Jiangfeng
2000: Meng Yan
2001: Tan Chunhua
2002: Meng Yan
2003: Shao Yi
2004: Meng Yan
2005: Zhang Shibao

High jump
1988: Zhu Jianhua
1989: Liu Yunpeng
1990: Zhou Zhongge
1991: Xu Yang
1992: Xu Yang
1993: Xu Yang
1994: Tao Xu
1995: Bi Hongyong
1996: Niu Jiang
1997: Bi Hongyong
1998: Zhou Zhongge
1999: Wang Zhouzhou
2000: Zhou Zhongge
2001: Zhou Zhongge
2002: Wang Zhouzhou
2003: Wang Zhouzhou
2004: Liu Yang
2005: Zhang Shufeng

Pole vault
1988: Qin Cheng
1989: Liang Xueren
1990: Liang Xueren
1991: Ge Yun
1992: Ge Yun
1993: Ge Yun
1994: Zhao Mingqiang
1995: Ge Yun
1996: Xu Gang
1997: Xu Gang
1998: Xu Gang
1999: Xu Gang
2000: Zhang Hongwei
2001: Wu Jun
2002: Li Huasen
2003: Zhang Hongwei
2004: Zhang Hongwei
2005: Zhang Hongwei

Long jump
1988: Pang Yan
1989: Ma Guiming
1990: Huang Geng
1991: Chen Zunrong
1992: Huang Geng
1993: Xu Bin
1994: Huang Geng
1995: Huang Geng
1996: Huang Geng
1997: Lao Jianfeng
1998: Xu Bin
1999: Huang Le
2000: Wang Cheng
2001: Li Dalong
2002: Wang Cheng
2003: Huang Le
2004: Zhou Can
2005: Li Runrun

Triple jump
1988: Chen Yanping
1989: Chen Yanping
1990: Chen Yanping
1991: Zou Sixin
1992: Wu Lijun
1993: Zou Sixin
1994: Zou Sixin
1995: Zeng Lizhi
1996: Zou Sixin
1997: Zou Sixin
1998: Duan Qifeng
1999: Wu Ji
2000: Lao Jianfeng
2001: Lao Jianfeng
2002: Lao Jianfeng
2003: Gu Junjie
2004: Li Yanxi
2005: Zhu Shujing

Shot put
1988: Ma Yongfeng
1989: Cheng Zhaowen
1990: Ma Yongfeng
1991: Cheng Shaobo
1992: Ma Yongfeng
1993: Xie Shengying
1994: Liu Hao
1995: Liu Hao
1996: Liu Hao
1997: Wen Jili
1998: Liu Hao
1999: Wen Jili
2000: Liu Hao
2001: Wen Jili
2002: Jia Peng
2003: Wang Zhiyong
2004: Jia Peng
2005: Jia Peng

Discus throw
1988: Zhang Jinglong
1989: Zhang Jinglong
1990: Wang Daoming
1991: Yu Wenge
1992: Yu Wenge
1993: Zhang Cunbiao
1994: Ma Wei
1995: Ma Wei
1996: Li Shaojie
1997: Yu Wenge
1998: Zhang Cunbiao
1999: Li Shaojie
2000: Li Shaojie
2001: Wu Tao
2002: Wu Tao
2003: Wu Tao
2004: Wu Tao
2005: Wu Tao

Hammer throw
1988: ?
1989: Yu Guangming
1990: Bi Zhong
1991: Bi Zhong
1992: Bi Zhong
1993: Bi Zhong
1994: Bi Zhong
1995: Bi Zhong
1996: Bi Zhong
1997: Bi Zhong
1998: Ye Kuigang
1999: Ye Kuigang
2000: Ye Kuigang
2001: Ye Kuigang
2002: Ye Kuigang
2003: Ye Kuigang
2004: Ye Kuigang
2005: Zhao Yihai

Javelin throw
1988: Ji Zhanzheng
1989: Wang Zhongwen
1990: Tang Linhua
1991: Zhang Lianbiao
1992: Zhang Lianbiao
1993: Zhang Lianbiao
1994: Zhang Lianbiao
1995: Zhang Lianbiao
1996: Zhang Lianbiao
1997: Gao Wenxu
1998: Li Rongxiang
1999: Li Rongxiang
2000: Zhang Lianbiao
2001: Li Rongxiang
2002: Li Rongxiang
2003: Li Rongxiang
2004: Chen Qi
2005: Chen Qi

Decathlon
1988: Wang Yan
1989: Ji Rongxin
1990: Gong Guohua
1991: Cai Min
1992: Cai Min
1993: Zhao Bingchun
1994: Cai Min
1995: Zhong Hongxin
1996: Guo Zhengrong
1997: Song Shulin
1998: Song Shulin
1999: Cao Wen
2000: Du Xiaopeng
2001: Qi Haifeng
2002: Qi Haifeng
2003: Qi Haifeng
2004: Qi Haifeng
2005: Qi Haifeng

20 kilometres walk
Held on a track from 1988 to 1992. Both track and road events were held from 1998 to 2000. Multiple national championships in the 20 km road event have been held since 2002, with both a spring and autumn Chinese Race Walking Championships taking place.
1988: ?
1989: Chen Helin
1990: Li Mingcai
1991: Li Mingcai
1992: Li Mingcai
1993: Li Mingcai
1994: Bu Lingtang
1995: Tan Mingjun
1996: Li Mingcai
1997: Yu Guohui
1998: Yu Guohui (road & track)
1999: He Xiaodong (road) & Wu Ping (track)
2000: Yu Guohui (spring road) & Li Zewen (autumn road and track)
2001: Li Zewen
2002: Yu Chaohong (spring) & Lü Ronghua (autumn)
2003: Zhu Hongjun (spring) & Yu Chaohong (autumn)
2004: Han Yucheng (spring) & Cui Zhide (autumn)
2005: Yu Chaohong (spring)

50 kilometres walk
Multiple national championships in the 50 km road event have been held since 2002, with both a spring and autumn Chinese Race Walking Championships taking place. The 1999 autumn championship was held on a track.
1988: ?
1989: Li Baojin
1990: Zhai Wanbo
1991: Sun Xiaoguang
1992: Mao Xinyuan
1993: Chen Shaoguo
1994: Zhou Yongsheng
1995: Shen Weihui
1996: Zhao Yongsheng
1997: Zhao Yongsheng
1998: Wang Yinhang
1999: Wang Yinhang (road) & Zhao Yongsheng (track)
2000: Zhang Huiqiang (spring) & Wang Yinhang (autumn)
2001: Wang Yinhang
2002: Wang Yinhang (spring) & Bian Aiguo (autumn)
2003: Yu Chaohong (spring & autumn)
2004: Han Yucheng (spring) & Xing Shucai (autumn)
2005: Han Yucheng (spring)

Women

100 metres
1988: Tian Yumei
1989: Zhang Caihua
1990: Tian Yumei
1991: Xiao Yehua
1992: Gao Han
1993: Wang Lei
1994: Huang Xiaoyan
1995: Xiao Yehua
1996: Yan Jiankui
1997: Li Xuemei
1998: Li Yali
1999: Huang Mei
2000: Li Xuemei
2001: Chen Yueqin
2002: Qin Wangping
2003: Qin Wangping
2004: Li Xuemei
2005: Qin Wangping

200 metres
1988: Xie Zhiling
1989: Liu Yunli
1990: Tian Yumei
1991: Chen Zhaojing
1992: Chen Zhaojing
1993: Chen Zhaojing
1994: Chen Zhaojing
1995: Zhu Yihong
1996: Yan Jiankui
1997: Li Xuemei
1998: Yan Jiankui
1999: Qin Wangping
2000: Li Xuemei
2001: Huang Mei
2002: Qin Wangping
2003: Qin Wangping
2004: Li Xuemei
2005: Qin Wangping

400 metres
1988: Sun Sumei
1989: Sun Sumei
1990: Li Guilian
1991: Huang Yanhong
1992: Sun Sumei
1993: Ma Yuqin
1994: Ma Yuqin
1995: Li Jing
1996: Du Xiujie
1997: Zhang Hengyun
1998: Chen Yuxiang
1999: Zhong Shaoting
2000: Bu Fanfang
2001: Chen Yuxiang
2002: Chen Yuxiang
2003: Sun Hongfeng
2004: Tang Xiaoyin
2005: Tang Xiaoyin

800 metres
1988: Mao Yujie
1989: Sun Sumei
1990: Zheng Lijuan
1991: Zhang Yumei
1992: Sun Sumei
1993: Chen Xuehui
1994: Qu Yunxia
1995: Zhang Jian
1996: Zhang Jian
1997: Zhang Xiaolan
1998: Zhang Jian
1999: Lin Na
2000: Wang Yuanping
2001: Feng Lei
2002: Liu Xiaoping
2003: Liu Xiaoping
2004: Liu Xiaoping
2005: Liu Qing

1500 metres
1988: Liu Aicun
1989: Feng Yangbo
1990: Zheng Lijuan
1991: Zhang Yumei
1992: Qu Yunxia
1993: Wei Li
1994: Qu Yunxia
1995: Yan Wei
1996: Wang Chunmei
1997: Yan Wei
1998: Yan Wei
1999: Wang Chunmei
2000: Wu Qingdong
2001: Wang Chunmei
2002: Lin Na
2003: Xing Huina
2004: Xing Huina
2005: Liu Qing

3000 metres
1988: Wang Yanling
1989: Wang Xiuting
1990: Zhong Huandi
1991: Zheng Lijuan
1992: Qu Yunxia
1993: Wang Junxia
1994: Wang Xiaoxia

5000 metres
1988: Wang Huabi
1989: Zhong Huandi
1990: Not held
1991: Zheng Lijuan
1992: Wei Li
1993: Not held
1994: Not held
1995: Wang Junxia
1996: Wang Junxia
1997: Liu Shixiang
1998: Wang Chunmei
1999: Wang Chunmei
2000: Dong Yanmei
2001: Wang Chunmei
2002: Sun Yingjie
2003: Sun Yingjie
2004: Xing Huina
2005: Xing Huina

10,000 metres
1988: Li Xiuxen
1989: Zhong Huandi
1990: Zhong Huandi
1991: Zhong Huandi
1992: Zhong Huandi
1993: Wang Junxia
1994: Wang Junxia
1995: Dong Zhaoxia
1996: Wang Junxia
1997: Dong Zhaoxia
1998: Liu Shixiang
1999: Zheng Guixia
2000: Li Ji
2001: Dai Yanyan
2002: Sun Yingjie
2003: Sun Yingjie
2004: Sun Yingjie
2005: Zhou Chunxiu

Marathon
1988: ?
1989: Xie Lihua
1990: ?
1991: Li Yemei
1992: Xie Lihua
1993: Wang Junxia
1994: Ren Xiujuan
1995: Zheng Guixia
1996: Ren Xiujuan
1997: Zheng Guixia
1998: Sun Yingjie
1999: Zheng Guixia
2000: Ren Xiujuan
2001: Zheng Guixia
2002: Liu Min
2003: Zhou Chunxiu
2004: Zhou Chunxiu
2005: Zhou Chunxiu
2006: Sun Weiwei

3000 metres steeplechase
2003: Chen Xiaofang

100 metres hurdles
1988: Liu Huayin
1989: Xiao Zifang
1990: Luo Bin
1991: Zhang Yu
1992: Zhang Yu
1993: Zhang Yu
1994: Zhang Yu
1995: Zhou Jing
1996: Zhang Yu
1997: Zhang Yu
1998: Deng Xiaocen
1999: Feng Yun
2000: Su Yiping
2001: Feng Yun
2002: Su Yiping
2003: Su Yiping
2004: Su Yiping
2005: Feng Yun

400 metres hurdles
1988: Chen Dongmei
1989: Chen Juying
1990: Chen Juying
1991: Huang Yanhong
1992: Zhang Weimin
1993: Guo Yue
1994: Leng Xueyan
1995: Zhou Wei
1996: Wu Wei
1997: Ma Xiaoyan
1998: Song Yinglan
1999: Li Yulian
2000: Li Yulian
2001: Song Yinglan
2002: Yao Yuehua
2003: Hung Xiaoxiao
2004: Yao Yuehua
2005: Wang Xing

High jump
1988: Jin Ling
1989: Wang Hui
1990: Zhang Tong
1991: Fu Xiuhong
1992: Wang Wei
1993: Ge Ping
1994: Guan Weihua
1995: Liu Yen
1996: Wang Wei
1997: Wang Wei
1998: Jin Ling
1999: Jing Xuezhu
2000: Zhang Liwen
2001: Jing Xuezhu
2002: Lu Jieming
2003: Jing Xuezhu
2004: Jing Xuezhu
2005: Jing Xuezhu

Pole vault
1989: Wu Weili
1990: Zhang Chunzhen
1991: Zhang Chunzhen
1992: Sun Caiyun
1993: Sun Caiyun
1994: Cai Weiyan
1995: Zhong Guiqing
1996: Sun Caiyun
1997: Cai Weiyan
1998: Cai Weiyan
1999: Sun Caiyun
2000: Gao Shuying
2001: Gao Shuying
2002: Gao Shuying
2003: Zhao Yingying
2004: Gao Shuying
2005: Zhao Yingying

Long jump
1988: Xiong Qiying
1989: Liu Shuzhen
1990: Liu Shuzhen
1991: Wang Chunfang
1992: Liu Shuzhen
1993: Yao Weili
1994: Li Jing
1995: Feng Jie
1996: Zhong Mei
1997: Xiong Qiying
1998: Guan Yingnan
1999: Guan Yingnan
2000: Guan Yingnan
2001: Zhong Mei
2002: Jin Yan
2003: Liang Shuyan
2004: Guan Yingnan
2005: Wang Lina

Triple jump
1989: Fu Xiaorong
1990: Li Huirong
1991: Li Huirong
1992: Li Huirong
1993: Zhang Yan
1994: Ren Ruiping
1995: Ren Ruiping
1996: Ren Ruiping
1997: Ren Ruiping
1998: Wu Lingmei
1999: Ren Ruiping
2000: Ren Ruiping
2001: Wu Lingmei
2002: Huang Qiuyan
2003: Huang Qiuyan
2004: Huang Qiuyan
2005: Huang Qiuyan

Shot put
1988: Huang Zhihong
1989: Huang Zhihong
1990: Huang Zhihong
1991: Huang Zhihong
1992: Huang Zhihong
1993: Zhou Tianhua
1994: Zhang Liuhong
1995: Sui Xinmei
1996: Li Meisu
1997: Li Meisu
1998: Li Meisu
1999: Cheng Xiaoyan
2000: Song Feina
2001: Cheng Xiaoyan
2002: Li Meiju
2003: Li Fengfeng
2004: Li Meiju
2005: Li Meiju

Discus throw
1988: Hou Xuemei
1989: Hou Xuemei
1990: Hou Xuemei
1991: Min Chunfeng
1992: Qiu Qiaoping
1993: Zhang Cuilan
1994: Qiu Qiaoping
1995: Cao Qi
1996: Xiao Yanling
1997: Liu Fengying
1998: Liu Fengying
1999: Luan Zhili
2000: Xiao Yanling
2001: Song Aimin
2002: Song Aimin
2003: Song Aimin
2004: Huang Qun
2005: Sun Taifeng

Hammer throw
1998: Gu Yuan
1999: Zhao Wei
2000: Liu Yinghui
2001: Zhao Wei
2002: Liu Yinghui
2003: Gu Yuan
2004: Zhang Wenxiu
2005: Zhang Wenxiu

Javelin throw
1988: Zhang Li
1989: Xin Xiaoli
1990: Xu Demei
1991: Xu Demei
1992: Ha Xiaoyan
1993: Zhang Li
1994: Zhang Li
1995: Tang Lishuang
1996: Li Lei
1997: Wang Yan
1998: Chu Chunxia
1999: Wang Yaning
2000: Liang Lili
2001: Ha Xiaoyan
2002: Liang Lili
2003: Ma Ning
2004: Xue Juan
2005: Xue Juan

Heptathlon
1988: Dong Yuping
1989: Wu Ping
1990: Ma Miaolan
1991: Zhu Yuqing
1992: Zhu Yuqing
1993: Ma Miaolan
1994: Zhang Xiaohui
1995: Wang Xiuyan
1996: Ding Ying
1997: Liu Bo
1998: Ding Ying
1999: Wang Hailan
2000: Liu Xing
2001: Wang Hailan
2002: Shen Shengfei
2003: Shen Shengfei
2004: Shen Shengfei
2005: Shen Shengfei

5000 metres walk
1988: Cui Yingzi
1989: Chen Yueling
1990: Jin Bingjie
1991: Chen Yueling

10 kilometres walk
The event was held on a track in 1989. A track and a road championship were staged in 1992, 1993 and 1998 to 2000. Multiple national championships in the 10 km road event were held in  2002 and 2003, with both a spring and an autumn Chinese Race Walking Championships taking place.
1988: ?
1989: Chen Yueling (track)
1990: Li Jingxue
1991: Chen Yueling
1992: Chen Yueling (road) & Cui Yingzi (track)
1993: Wang Yan (road and track)
1994: Gao Hongmiao
1995: Feng Haixia
1996: Gao Hongmiao
1997: Wang Yuntao
1998: Wang Yan (road) & Gao Mingxia (track)
1999: Gu Yan (road) & Li Hong (track)
2000: Li Hong (road) & Gao Hongmiao (track)
2001: Li Hong
2002: Gao Kelian (spring) & Zuo Yan (autumn)
2003: Gao Kelian (spring)

20 kilometres walk
Multiple national championships in the 20 km road event have been held since 2002, with both a spring and an autumn Chinese Race Walking Championships taking place. The 1999 autumn race was held on a track.
1994: Gao Hongmiao
1995: Liu Hongyu
1996: Feng Haixia
1997: Liu Hongyu
1998: Pam Hailian
1999: Xue Ailing (spring) & Li Yuxin (autumn)
2000: Wang Liping (spring & autumn)
2001: Gao Hongmiao
2002: Gao Kelian & Zuo Yan (autumn)
2003: Song Hongjuan (spring) & Zhang Nan (autumn)
2004: Song Hongjuan (spring) & Jiang Jing (autumn)
2005: Jiang Jing (spring)

References

Champions 1988–2006
Chinese Championships. GBR Athletics. Retrieved 2021-01-29.

Winners
 List
Chinese Championships
Athletics